Robert Kirkland Henry (February 9, 1890 – November 20, 1946) was a banker and politician from Wisconsin.  As a Democrat, he served as Wisconsin State Treasurer.  As a Republican, he served in the United States House of Representatives.

Biography
Henry was born in Jefferson, Wisconsin on February 9, 1890.  He attended the University of Wisconsin–Madison for two years, and then began a career in banking.  He rose through the ranks of the Jefferson County Bank to become cashier and a member of the board of directors.

In 1932 he was the successful Democratic nominee for State Treasurer, and he served two terms, 1933 to 1937.  He was an unsuccessful candidate for reelection in 1936.

In 1938 he ran for the Republican nomination for Governor of Wisconsin, and lost to Julius Heil, who went on to defeat Philip La Follette, the Wisconsin Progressive Party nominee in the general election.

Henry served on the Jefferson Municipal Water and Light Commission from 1939 to 1944.  From 1940 to 1944 he was a member of the State Banking Commission 1940-1944.

He was elected to Congress in 1944 and re-elected in 1946.  He served in the 79th Congress, but died before the start of the 80th Congress.

Henry died in Madison, Wisconsin on November 20, 1946.  He was buried at Greenwood Cemetery in Jefferson.

See also
 List of United States Congress members who died in office (1900–49)

References

External links
 
 Presidential and Congressional Election Statistics
 

1890 births
State treasurers of Wisconsin
1946 deaths
People from Jefferson, Wisconsin
University of Wisconsin–Madison alumni
Wisconsin Democrats
Republican Party members of the United States House of Representatives from Wisconsin
20th-century American politicians